Dietmar Mögenburg (born 15 August 1961) is a (West) German former high jumper who won gold medals at the 1984 Summer Olympics in Los Angeles and at the 1982 European Championships in Athens.

Career
On 26 May 1980, at the age of 18, Mögenburg jumped 2.35 m which tied the world outdoor record set by Jacek Wszoła of Poland. At the time, this mark also established a new world outdoor junior record. He reached his outdoor peak on 10 June 1984 when he cleared 2.36 m in Eberstadt, in  a competition won by Zhu Jianhua with a world record of 2.39 m. Mögenburg would later establish a new world indoor mark of 2.39 m on 14 February 1985 in Cologne. As of 2015, the only German to have jumped higher is his 1980s rival Carlo Thränhardt, who cleared 2.37 m outdoors (1984) and 2.42 m indoors (1988).

International competitions
10-time West German High Jump Champion (1980–85, 1987–90)
5-time West German Indoor High Jump Champion (1979–81, 1984, 1989)

Note: Result with a q, indicates overall position in qualifying round.

References

External links

1961 births
Living people
West German male high jumpers
Athletes (track and field) at the 1984 Summer Olympics
Athletes (track and field) at the 1988 Summer Olympics
Athletes (track and field) at the 1992 Summer Olympics
Olympic athletes of West Germany
Olympic athletes of Germany
Olympic gold medalists for West Germany
Sportspeople from Leverkusen
World record setters in athletics (track and field)
European Athletics Championships medalists
Medalists at the 1984 Summer Olympics
Olympic gold medalists in athletics (track and field)
World Athletics Indoor Championships medalists